is a Japanese former footballer who played for the Japan national team starting in 2003, and from 2012 to 2016 served as captain of the team. She appeared in four World Cups between 2003 and 2015, including the team that won the 2011 World Cup for Japan. Miyama also led Japan to a silver medal at the 2012 Summer Olympics in London.

Club career

Early career
Miyama was born in Ōamishirasato, Sanbu District, Chiba Prefecture, on 28 January 1985 . She started her career as a football player in the club her father founded. She later joined Nippon TV Beleza in 1999 after playing with their youth team, but when she was in eleventh grade, she left the team and went to the high school football club. Even among male players, she kept playing football.

Miyama joined L.League side Okayama Yunogo Belle in 2001, having received an invitation from Midori Honda, the coach.

WPS

On 24 November 2008, Miyama was selected by Los Angeles Sol of the U.S. Women's Professional Soccer (WPS) in the 2008 WPS International Draft, and joined Sol in 2009. In the 2009 Women's Professional Soccer season, she had 6 assists but no goals. When the Sol disbanded in early 2010, she was taken by Saint Louis Athletica. Miyama signed as a free agent with the Atlanta Beat on 10 June 2010.

Return to Japan
Miyama returned to Okayama Yunogo Belle in September 2010. She left the club at the end of the 2016 season.

International career
At the 2007 World Cup held in China, Miyama performed brilliantly in Japan's match against England, scoring the team's two goals both from direct free kicks as they held on to a draw. In Japan's first group stage match of the 2011 World Cup, she scored the go-ahead goal in Japan's win against New Zealand from another free kick in the 68th minute, and was named Player of the Match.

At the 2011 World Cup in Germany, Miyama scored the winner – a curling free kick – to help Japan beat New Zealand, and netted Japan's first goal in the final against the USA. Miyama also scored Japan's first penalty of the eventual penalty shoot-out in the final which ended 2–2 after extra time. Her team won 3–1 in the penalty shoot-out, making them the first Asian team to win the World Cup. In the moment of victory, Miyama did not join her teammates in celebration, but instead went to the American players to hug and congratulate them. This has been reported both by Hope Solo and the Japanese media as evidence of Miyama's sportsmanship and respect for her opponents.

Miyama was named the AFC Women's Footballer of the Year in 2011, 2012 and 2015.

At the 2012 Summer Olympics, Miyama led Japan to the silver medal as captain. At the 2015 World Cup, she also captained the team and lost in the final to the USA. At the 2016 AFC Women's Olympic Qualifying Tournament, Japan failed to qualify for the 2016 Summer Olympics. Following the tournament, she retired from the national team. She played 162 matches and scored 38 goals for Japan.

Career statistics

Club

International

Scores and results list Japan's goal tally first, score column indicates score after each Miyama goal.

Honors
Japan
 FIFA Women's World Cup: 2011; runner-up: 2015
 Summer Olympics runner-up: 2012
 AFC Women's Asian Cup: 2014
 Asian Games Gold Medal: 2010
 East Asian Football Championship: 2008, 2010

Individual
 FIFA Women's World Cup All-Star Team: 2011
 FIFA Women's World Cup Bronze Ball: 2015
 AFC Women's Asian Cup Best player: 2014
 AFC Women's Player of the Year: 2011, 2012, 2015
 Algarve Cup Best player: 2012
 L.League Division 1 Best Eleven (6): 2007, 2008, 2011, 2012, 2013, 2014
 L.League Division 2 Best Player: 2004
 L.League Division 2 top scorer: 2004
 FIFPro: FIFA FIFPro World XI 2015
 IFFHS AFC Woman Team of the Decade 2011–2020

See also 
 List of women's footballers with 100 or more caps
 List of players who have appeared in multiple FIFA Women's World Cups

References

External links
 

Japan Football Association
 Okayama Yunogo Belle player profile

1985 births
Living people
Association football people from Chiba Prefecture
Japanese women's footballers
Japan women's international footballers
Nadeshiko League players
Women's Professional Soccer players
Nippon TV Tokyo Verdy Beleza players
Okayama Yunogo Belle players
Los Angeles Sol players
Saint Louis Athletica players
Atlanta Beat (WPS) players
Japanese expatriate footballers
Expatriate women's soccer players in the United States
Japanese expatriate sportspeople in the United States
FIFA Women's World Cup-winning players
2003 FIFA Women's World Cup players
2007 FIFA Women's World Cup players
2011 FIFA Women's World Cup players
2015 FIFA Women's World Cup players
Olympic footballers of Japan
Olympic medalists in football
Olympic silver medalists for Japan
Medalists at the 2012 Summer Olympics
Footballers at the 2008 Summer Olympics
Footballers at the 2012 Summer Olympics
Asian Games gold medalists for Japan
Asian Games medalists in football
Asian Games silver medalists for Japan
Medalists at the 2006 Asian Games
Medalists at the 2010 Asian Games
Medalists at the 2014 Asian Games
Footballers at the 2006 Asian Games
Footballers at the 2010 Asian Games
Footballers at the 2014 Asian Games
FIFA Century Club
Women's association football midfielders